The Green Point Lighthouse, Cape Town is an operational lighthouse on the South African coast. First lit on 12 April 1824, it is located on Mouille Point. The lighthouse was the first solid lighthouse structure on the South African coast and the oldest operational lighthouse in South Africa. The lighthouse was commissioned by acting Governor of the Cape Colony Sir Rufane Shaw Donkin and designed by German architect Herman Shutte. Building commenced in 1821 and was completed in 1823. The lighthouse started operating in 1824. The lighthouse cost approximately £6,420 pounds sterling to build. When the lighthouse was first lit, it burned Argand lamps fueled by sperm whale oil. The lighthouse was expanded to its present height in 1865. In 1922, the range of the light house was extended to 22 nautical miles when 3rd order dioptric flashing lights were installed. Its present characteristic is a white light flashing every 10 seconds. In 1926, a foghorn was installed in the lighthouse despite a letter of complaint sent to the Mayor of Cape Town in 1923 by Green Point residents. Local Residents call the Green Point Lighthouse "Moaning Minnie".

History
The lighthouse was designed by Herman Shutte, who arrived in the Cape in 1790. Records state that his profession at the time of his arrival was a sculptor. The building was commissioned in 1820 by Sir Rufane Shaw Donkin, who was the acting Commissioner of the Cape at the time. The building of the lighthouse took 3 years as the official governor of the Cape, Lord Charles Somerset had not been consulted and he halted the project. The lighthouse was expanded to its current state in 1865 and certified a Provincial heritage site on 12 January 1973.

Senior lightkeepers

Accidents
The rotating beam of the lighthouse was stopped and focused on the wreck of the S.A. Seafearer in order to provide light for the rescue operation when the ship ran aground on  1 July 1966.

Sightseeing
The lighthouse is open to the public for an entrance fee. The lighthouse is part of various sightseeing tours in Cape Town.

See also

 List of lighthouses in South Africa

References

Citations

Bibliography

Further reading

External links

Green Point Lighthouse (Cape Town, South Africa), Lighthouse Depot
Green Point [CT], The Lighthouse Company

Lighthouses in South Africa
Buildings and structures in Cape Town
Lighthouses completed in 1824